Pociškė is a village in Švenčionys District, Lithuania. It is located 8 kilometres south of the Adutiškis. According to the 2011 census, it had 5 residents.

Notable people 
  (1876−1954),  priest, member of the Polish Senate

References

External links 
 Pociszki 

Villages in Vilnius County
Švenčionys District Municipality